Idmon latifascia is a butterfly in the family Hesperiidae. It was described by Henry John Elwes and James Edwards in 1897. It is found on Sumatra and Borneo.

References

Butterflies described in 1897
Ancistroidini
Butterflies of Indonesia